Tarun Rai Kaga is an Indian politician. He is a former Member of Legislative Assembly from Chohtan constituency Rajasthan, leader of the Bharatiya Janata Party.

References

Living people
People from Barmer district
Rajasthan MLAs 2013–2018
Bharatiya Janata Party politicians from Rajasthan
1946 births